The 1890–91 season was the fifth in the history of Royal Arsenal, the club that was to become Arsenal F.C. This was the club's first season as a professional side, with overwhelming support to do so from the players. Their achievements in the previous season saw them granted direct admission to the First Round Proper of the FA Cup, marking their first full appearance in the competition. This season also saw them move grounds from Manor Field to the Invicta Ground, also in Plumstead. During the season, the team played in three cup competitions: the FA Cup, the London Senior Cup and the London Charity Cup. After finishing as runners-up the previous season, they won the London Senior Cup for the first time. Turning professional meant that they rescinded their membership of both London and Kent FAs, though support for the club continued to soar, with average attendances of 6,600, higher than half the teams in The Football League.

Matches 
Royal Arsenal played 35 matches during the 1890–91 season, of which 27 were friendlies, 8 were competitive fixtures, with one of these being a first-class FA Cup fixture.

Players 
Below is a list of all players who made at least one appearance for Arsenal over the season. Interestingly, this was also the first season in which an official substitution was recorded, with HT. Offer coming on and some point during the 25 April 1891 game against Sunderland. Players making their debut for Arsenal are shown in Bold, Goalkeepers are marked in Italics.

References 

Arsenal F.C. seasons
Arsenal